HMS Cockatrice was an  of the British Royal Navy. She was built by Hawthorn Leslie and Company, launching in 1912 and served throughout the First World War. She was sold for scrap in 1921.

Construction
Cockatrice was one of three s ordered from the Newcastle upon Tyne shipbuilder Hawthorn Leslie and Company as part of the 1911–1912 shipbuilding programme for the Royal Navy. In all, 20 Acasta-class ships were ordered as part of this programme, of which 12, including Cockatrice, were to the standard Admiralty design with the other 8 ships to their builder's own designs. Cockatrice was laid down on 23 October 1911 and launched on 8 November 1912. In 1912, as part of a general reorganisation of the Royal Navy's destroyers into alphabetical classes, the Acastas became the K class, and in 1913, it was decided to switch to names beginning with the class letter, with Cockatrice being allocated the name Kingfisher, but this plan was abandoned for the class and Cockatrice completed under her original name in March 1913.

The ships had a crew of 73 officers and ratings.

The ship's main gun armament consisted of three  BL Mk VIII guns, with 120 rounds of ammunition carried per gun. Two  torpedo tubes were fitted, while two reload torpedoes could be carried. By January 1916, Cockatrice was recorded as being fitted with minesweeping gear. In 1916, one of Cockatrices 4-inch guns was converted to a high-angle mount, allowing it to be used for anti-aircraft fire, but in 1918, this gun, together with both torpedo tubes, was removed to allow a heavy depth charge armament.

Service
Cockatrice joined her sister ships in the 4th Destroyer Flotilla of the Home Fleet based at Portsmouth. With the outbreak of the First World War in August 1914, the 4th Flotilla, including Cockatrice, joined the newly established Grand Fleet, based at Scapa Flow in Orkney. Cockatrice was damaged during a severe storm in December 1914.

Cockatrice remained part of the 4th Flotilla in May 1916, but was absent from the Battle of Jutland, when most of the 4th Flotilla took part, as she was undergoing refit. The 4th Flotilla, including Cockatrice, left the Grand Fleet and moved to the Humber in July 1916, with the role of protecting British minesweepers and deterring German minelayers off the east coast of England. By December that year, Cockatrice had relocated again as the 4th Flotilla transferred to Portsmouth to carry out anti-submarine operations in the English Channel, while by March 1917, the 4th Flotilla had moved to Devonport. Cockatrice was still part of the 4th Destroyer Flotilla in August 1918, but by the end of the war had joined the Northern Patrol Force based at Dundee.

Disposal
Cockatrice was sold for scrap to the ship breakers Thos. W. Ward of Hayle on 9 May 1921.

Pennant numbers

Notes

Citations

References

External links
 

 

Acasta-class destroyers
World War I destroyers of the United Kingdom
Ships built on the River Tyne
1912 ships